Uasal is an Irish language female given name.

Bearers of the name

 Duine uasal Suibhne, died 643.

See also
List of Irish-language given names
 Duine uasal

External links
 http://medievalscotland.org/kmo/AnnalsIndex/Feminine/Uasal.shtml

Irish-language feminine given names